Francis Griffin may refer to:

 Francis Griffin (Family Guy)
 Francis Griffin (priest) (1893–1983), Irish Spiritan priest
 L. Francis Griffin, American civil rights advocate